Alsophila manniana, synonym Cyathea manniana, the spiny tree fern or sheshino, is a species of tree fern. It is readily identified by the fierce spines on its trunk, and is widespread in the tropical regions of Africa.

Description

Alsophila manniana has a slender trunk (10 cm diameter), reaching some 7 m in height, sometimes producing lateral stems which initially function as props or stilts, but later may form new trunks. Fronds are leathery. Stems are protected by spines; aphlebia are absent in the crown of the stem.

This species was first described by William Hooker in 'Synopsis Filicum' 21 (1865), based on a specimen collected on Fernando Po by Gustav Mann (1836–1916), a German botanist who led expeditions to West Africa and was also a gardener at the Royal Botanic Gardens, Kew, and consequently named after Mann.

Distribution and habitat
This species is found in deep shade, next to mountain streams in evergreen forest in Sub-Saharan Africa. It is indigenous to Angola, Annobón, Bioko, Burundi, Cameroon, Central African Republic, Congo, Côte d'Ivoire, DRC, Equatorial Guinea, Ethiopia, Gabon, Ghana, Guinea, Kenya, Liberia, Malawi, Mozambique, Nigeria, Rwanda, Sao Tomé, Sierra Leone, Tanzania, Uganda, Zambia, and Zimbabwe.

Medicinal
An infusion of the pith and young leaves is used in traditional medicine for a variety of abdominal and gastric complaints, to ease childbirth and against tapeworms.

References

External links

Image of spiny trunk
"The shoot apex of Cyathea manniana - C. W. Wardlaw (1948)

manniana
Pantropical flora